The Regional District of Central Okanagan (RDCO) is a regional district in the Canadian province of British Columbia, representing two unincorporated Electoral Areas of Central Okanagan East and Central Okanagan West, along with the member municipalities of the City of Kelowna, City of West Kelowna the District of Lake Country, the District of Peachland and Westbank First Nation. The RDCO office is located in Kelowna.

Statistics Canada defines the Kelowna CMA (Census Metropolitan Area) or Kelowna Metropolitan Area as being identical in area with the RDCO. The population in 2016 was 194,882, an increase from the official Canada 2006 Census total of 162,276 (these figures exclude the population of reserves belonging to the Westbank First Nation). The area is 2,904.86 square kilometres.

Communities

Incorporated municipalities
Cities
Kelowna
West Kelowna
District municipalities
Lake Country
Peachland

Communities and neighbourhoods
Kelowna neighbourhoods

District municipality villages

Regional district electoral areas

Central Okanagan West Electoral (Central Okanagan J)
Central Okanagan West Electoral Area used to be known as the Westside Electoral Area. It was created from the merger of Central Okanagan G and Central Okanagan H. The 2005 population exclusive of anyone living on an Indian Reserve, was 37,638 people.  In 2007 most of the electoral area's population transferred to the jurisdiction of the newly incorporated District Municipality of West Kelowna.

Communities
Central Okanagan West
Beau Park
Blue Grouse
Brent Road
Caesars Landing
Cinnabar Estates
Crystal Mountain
Estamont
Ewings Landing
Fintry Delta
Jenny Creek
Killiney Beach
La Casa Resort
Lake Okanagan Resort
Muirallen Estates
Nahun
Pine Point
Secret Cove
Shelters Cove
Traders Cove
Trepanier Bench
Upper Fintry
Valley of the Sun
Wainman Cove
Westshores Estates
Wilson Landing

Central Okanagan East (Central Okanagan I)

Indigenous reserves
(within the boundaries of, but not part of, the RD)
Governed by the Okanagan Indian Band:
Duck Lake 7 (N end Ellison Lake, just south of Winfield)
Governed by the Westbank First Nation
Tsinstikeptum 9 (in West Kelowna)
Tsinstikeptum 10 (usually known as the Westbank Indian Reserve, in West Kelowna)
Mission Creek 8 (Okanagan Mission)
Medicine Creek 12, 10 km SE of Kelowna
Medicine Hill 11, 15 km SE of Kelowna

Demographics

Note: Totals greater than 100% due to multiple origin responses.

Notes

References

 Statistics Canada 2001 Community Profile - RDCO
Statistics Canada 2006 Community Profile: Central Okanagan

External links

 
Regional districts of British Columbia